Hall is an unincorporated community in Gregg Township, Morgan County, in the U.S. state of Indiana.

History
Hall was laid out in 1861. A post office was established at Hall in 1854, and remained in operation until it was discontinued in 1966.

The Hall School is listed on the National Register of Historic Places.

Geography

Notable person
Hall is the birthplace of former Indiana State & UCLA coach and Purdue player John Wooden.

References

Unincorporated communities in Morgan County, Indiana
Unincorporated communities in Indiana
Indianapolis metropolitan area
1861 establishments in Indiana